The Iraqi Amateur Radio Society (IARS) (in Arabic, هواة الراديو في المجتمع العراقي) is a national non-profit organization for amateur radio enthusiasts in Iraq.  The organization uses IARS as its official international abbreviation, based on the English translation of the organization's name.  IARS operates a QSL bureau for those members who regularly communicate with amateur radio operators in other countries and distributes a selection of Arabic-language books on amateur radio and radio technology.  The IARS represents the interests of Iraqi amateur radio operators and shortwave listeners before Iraqi and international telecommunications regulatory authorities.  Recognized in May, 2005, IARS is the national member society representing Iraq in the International Amateur Radio Union.

See also 
International Amateur Radio Union

References 

Iraq
Clubs and societies in Iraq
Radio in Iraq
Organizations based in Baghdad